Symphony is a 2004 Indian Malayalam-language erotic thriller film directed by I. V. Sasi and produced by M. N. Thankachan under the banner of EGNA Films. The film stars newcomers Siva, Anu Sasi and Swathi Varma with Riyaz Khan, Jagadish and Jagathy Sreekumar in supporting roles.

Plot

The film tells the story of Jijo Samson, a musician. His troupe comprises Shruthi who has left her family as she is in love with Jijo. One day they reach a lake-side resort to compose a new music album for Dominic Kalarickal. Jijo meets Sandra there and he falls for her despite knowing that she is a married woman to Satyanath. An extra marital affair develops as Shruthi is shattered. Things heat up as Satyanath arrives...

Cast
Shiva as Jijo Samson
Anu Sasi as Shruthi (as Anu I. V.)
Swathi Varma as Sandra Sathyanath
Riyaz Khan as Sathyanath
Jagadish as Manoharan
Jagathi Sreekumar as Dominic
Sudheesh  as Seby
Lakshmi Gopalaswamy as Sindhu
Sukumari as Deenamma
Kaithapram Damodaran Namboothiri as himself

Music
The music was composed by Deepak Dev.
"A Symphonic Feeling" (Instrumental)- Deepak Dev
"Chithramanikkaattil" (D)- K. S. Chithra, P. Jayachandran
"Chithramannikattil" (F)- Jyotsna
"Konchedi Konchedi Penne"- K. S. Chithra, Sujatha Mohan, V. Devanand
"Ninnethedi"- Deepak Dev, Ganga, Vidhu Prathap
"Ninnethedi" (Dance Mix)- Deepak Dev, Ganga, Vidhu Prathap
"Panimathiye"- K. S. Chithra
"Panimathiye" (D)- K. J. Yesudas, K. S. Chithra
"Raghuvamsha"- Nikhil K. Menon
"Sukhamo"- Sujatha Mohan, V. Devanand
"Sukhamo" (F)- Sujatha Mohan

References

External links

2004 films
2000s Malayalam-language films
Films directed by I. V. Sasi
Films scored by Deepak Dev